Sports are an important part of culture in the United States. Historically, the national sport has been baseball. However, in more recent decades, American football has been the most popular sport in terms of broadcast viewership audience. Basketball has grown into the mainstream American sports scene since the 1980s, with ice hockey and soccer doing the same around the turn of the 21st century. These sports comprise the "Big Five". In the first half of the 20th century, boxing and collegiate football were among the most popular sports after baseball. Golf, tennis, and collegiate basketball are other spectator sports with longstanding popularity. Most recently, Mixed martial arts, has been breaking records in attendance and broadcast viewership for all combat sports.

Based on revenue, the major professional sports leagues in the United States and Canada are the National Football League (NFL), Major League Baseball (MLB), the National Basketball Association (NBA), the National Hockey League (NHL), and Major League Soccer (MLS). At $16 billion in revenue, the NFL is the most profitable sports league in the world.

The market for professional sports in the United States is roughly $69 billion, roughly 50% larger than that of all of Europe, the Middle East, and Africa combined. All these leagues enjoy wide-ranging domestic media coverage and, except for Major League Soccer, all are considered the preeminent leagues in their respective sports in the world. Although American football does not have a substantial following in other nations, the NFL does have the highest average attendance (67,254) of any professional sports league in the world. MLS has the second highest average attendance of any sports league in the U.S. (21,789), followed by MLB with an average of 18,900. Of these five U.S.-based leagues, all but the NFL have at least one team in Canada.

Professional teams in all major sports in the United States operate as franchises within a league, meaning that a team may move to a different city if the team's owners believe there would be a financial benefit, but franchise moves are usually subject to some form of league-level approval. All major sports leagues use a similar type of regular-season schedule with a post-season playoff tournament.  In addition to the major league–level organizations, several sports also have professional minor leagues, active in smaller cities across the country. As in Canada and Australia, sports leagues in the United States do not practice promotion and relegation, unlike most sports leagues in Europe.

Sports are particularly associated with education in the United States, with most high schools and universities having organized sports, and this is a unique sporting footprint for the U.S. College sports competitions play an important role in the American sporting culture, and college basketball and college football are nearly as popular as professional sports in some parts of the country. The major sanctioning body for college sports is the National Collegiate Athletic Association (NCAA). Colleges collectively receive billions of dollars from TV deals, sponsorships, and ticket sales. In 2019, the total revenue generated by NCAA athletic departments added up to $18.9 billion.

Based on Olympic Games, World Championships, and other major competitions in respective sports, the United States is the most successful nation in baseball, basketball, athletics, swimming, lacrosse, beach volleyball, figure skating, tennis, golf, boxing, diving, shooting, rowing and snowboarding, and is all time one of the top five most successful nations in ice hockey, wrestling, gymnastics, volleyball, speed skating, alpine skiing, bobsleigh, equestrian, sailing, cycling, weightlifting and archery, among others. This makes the United States the most successful sports nation in the world. The United States has been referred to by some as the Hegemon of World Sports. The United States has placed first in the Summer Olympic medal table 18 times out of 29 Summer Olympics and 28 appearances. Unlike most other nations, the United States government does not provide funding for sports nor for the United States Olympic & Paralympic Committee.

History

American football, indoor American football, baseball, softball, and indoor soccer evolved out of older British (Rugby football, British baseball, Rounders, and association football) sports. However, basketball, volleyball, beach volleyball, racquetball, pickleball, skateboarding, snowboarding, Ultimate, wind-surfing, and Water Skiing are fully American inventions, some of which have become popular in other countries and worldwide.</ref>

In colonial Virginia and Maryland, sports occupied a great deal of attention at every social level. In England, hunting was severely restricted to landowners. In America, game was more than plentiful. Everyone—including servants and slaves—could and did hunt, so there was no social distinction to be had. In 1691, Sir Francis Nicholson, the governor of Virginia, organized competitions for the "better sort of Virginians onely who are especially in the South. It involved owners, trainers and spectators from all social classes and both races. However, religious evangelists were troubled by the gambling dimension, and democratic elements complained that it was too aristocratic, since only the rich could own very expensive competitive horses.

Up until the Civil War, cricket was a somewhat popular sport in the United States, with presidents such as George Washington and Abraham Lincoln having played or watched the game. However, cricket at the time was a sport played over several days, and during the Civil War, troops preferred to play the newly rising game of baseball, which was much shorter in duration and did not require a special playing surface to be played.

Olympics

The United States Olympic & Paralympic Committee (USOPC) is the National Olympic Committee for the United States. U.S. athletes have won a total of 2,522 medals (1,022 of them being gold) at the Summer Olympic Games and another 305 at the Winter Olympic Games. Most medals have been won in the sport of athletics (track and field) (801, 32%) and swimming (553, 22%). American swimmer Michael Phelps is the most decorated Olympic athlete of all time, with 28 Olympic medals, 23 of them gold.

The United States has sent athletes to every celebration of the modern Olympic Games except the 1980 Summer Olympics hosted by the Soviet Union in Moscow, which it boycotted because of the Soviet invasion of Afghanistan.

American athletes have won a total of 2,673 medals (1,075 of them gold) at the Summer Olympic Games and another 305 (105 of them gold) at the Winter Olympic Games, making the United States the most prolific medal-winning nation in the history of the Olympics. The US is ranked first in the all-time medal table even if all the incarnations of Russia and Germany are combined, leading the second-placed Russians by 402 gold and 917 total medals. These achievements are even more impressive considering the fact that the American Olympic team remains the only in the world to receive no government funding.

The United States hosted both Summer and Winter Games in 1932, and has hosted more Games than any other country – eight times, four times each for the Summer and Winter Games:
 The 1904 Summer Olympics in St. Louis, 1932 Summer Olympics and 1984 Summer Olympics in Los Angeles; and the 1996 Summer Olympics in Atlanta;
 The 1932 Winter Olympics and 1980 Winter Olympics in Lake Placid, New York; the 1960 Winter Olympics in Squaw Valley, California; and the 2002 Winter Olympics in Salt Lake City, Utah.

Los Angeles will host the Summer Olympics for a third time in 2028, marking the ninth time the U.S. hosts the Olympic Games.

The United States has won the most gold and overall medals in the Summer Olympic Games, even if the medal totals of the Soviet Union/CIS and Russia are combined, and has topped the medal table 18 times. The country has won the second most gold and overall medals in the Winter Olympic Games, behind Norway, but has topped the medal table only one time, in 1932. If all of Germany's and Russia's incarnations are combined, the United States slips to fourth in the all-time Winter Olympic Games table.

Amateurism and professionalism
The exclusion of professionals caused several controversies throughout the history of the modern Olympics. The 1912 Olympic pentathlon and decathlon champion Jim Thorpe was stripped of his medals when it was discovered that he had played semi-professional baseball before the Olympics. His medals were posthumously restored by the IOC in 1983 on compassionate grounds.

The advent of the state-sponsored "full-time amateur athlete" of the Eastern Bloc countries eroded the ideology of the pure amateur, as it put the self-financed amateurs of the Western countries at a disadvantage. The Soviet Union entered teams of athletes who were all nominally students, soldiers, or working in a profession, but all of whom were in reality paid by the state to train on a full-time basis. The situation greatly disadvantaged American athletes, and was a major factor in the decline of American medal hauls in the 1970s and 1980s. As a result, the Olympics shifted away from amateurism, as envisioned by Pierre de Coubertin, to allowing participation of professional athletes, but only in the 1990s, after the collapse of the Soviet Union and its influence within the International Olympic Committee.

Individual sports

Motorsports

Major international competitions, such as the Formula One Grand Prix series and MotoGP are generally less popular in the United States than they are in the rest of the world.  However, some Americans have achieved great success in these international series, such as Mario Andretti and Kenny Roberts. In the United States, the dominant form of auto racing is oval track racing, especially stock car racing, with other homegrown motorsports also having local popularity.

Americans, like the rest of the world, initially began using public streets to host automobile races, but these venues were often unsafe to the public as they offered relatively little crowd control. Promoters and drivers in the United States discovered that horse racing tracks could provide better conditions for drivers and spectators than public streets. This, in turn, was succeeded by board track racing (which was short-lived as many of the tracks were highly flammable and difficult to maintain) followed by oval track racing, which remains the dominant form of racing in the United States but is not used in the rest of the world; road racing has generally waned. However, an extensive, albeit illegal street racing culture still persists.

IndyCar Series

Historically, open wheel racing was the most popular form of U.S. motorsport nationwide. However, an acrimonious split (often referred to by many as "The Split") in 1994 between the primary series, CART (later known as Champ Car), and the owner of the Indianapolis Motor Speedway (the site of the Indy 500), Tony George, led to the formation of the Indy Racing League, now known as INDYCAR, which launched the rival IndyCar Series in 1996. From that point on, the popularity of open wheel racing in the U.S. declined dramatically. The feud was settled in 2008 with an agreement to merge the two series under the IndyCar banner, but enormous damage had already been done to the sport. Post-merger, IndyCar continues to run with slight viewership gains per year. However, as a result, the only post-Split IndyCar race that still enjoys widespread popularity among the general public is the Indianapolis 500.

NASCAR

The CART-IRL Split coincided with an enormous expansion of stock car racing, governed by NASCAR, from its past as a mostly regional circuit mainly followed in the Southern United States to a truly national sport.  NASCAR's audience peaked in the early 2000s, and has declined quite a bit ever since the implementation of the Chase for the Cup in 2004, though it continues to have around 2–4 million viewers per race. Among NASCAR's popular former drivers are Jeff Gordon, Dale Earnhardt, Jimmie Johnson, Tony Stewart, Dale Earnhardt Jr., and Richard Petty. Among NASCAR's popular active drivers are Kevin Harvick, Alex Bowman, Kurt Busch, Kyle Busch, Chase Elliott, Ryan Blaney, and Kyle Larson. NASCAR's most popular race is the Daytona 500, the opening race of the season, held each year at Daytona Beach, Florida in February.

Other motorsports
Notable sports car races in the United States are the 24 Hours of Daytona, 12 Hours of Sebring, and Petit Le Mans, which have featured in the World Sportscar Championship, IMSA GT Championship, Intercontinental Le Mans Cup, FIA World Endurance Championship, American Le Mans Series, Rolex Sports Car Series and currently the IMSA SportsCar Championship.

Another one of the most popular forms of motorsports in the United States is the indigenous sport of drag racing. The largest drag racing organization is the National Hot Rod Association.

Several other motorsports enjoy varying degrees of popularity in the United States: short track motor racing, motocross, monster truck competitions (including the popular Monster Jam circuit), demolition derby, figure 8 racing, mud bogging and tractor pulling.

Golf

Golf is played in the United States by about 24 million people. The sport's national governing body, the United States Golf Association (USGA), is jointly responsible with The R&A for setting and administering the rules of golf. The USGA conducts four national championships open to professionals: the U.S. Open, U.S. Women's Open, U.S. Senior Open, and the U.S. Senior Women's Open, with the last of these holding its first edition in 2018. The PGA of America organizes the PGA Championship, Senior PGA Championship and Women's PGA Championship. Three legs of the Grand Slam of Golf are based in the United States: the PGA Championship, U.S. Open and The Masters. (The Open Championship, known in the U.S. as the British Open, is played in the United Kingdom.)

The PGA Tour is the main professional golf tour in the United States, and the LPGA Tour is the main women's professional tour. Also of note is PGA Tour Champions, where players 50 and older compete. Golf is aired on several television networks, such as Golf Channel, NBC, ESPN, CBS and Fox.

Notable American male golfers include Walter Hagen (11 majors), Ben Hogan, Jack Nicklaus (record 18 major wins), Arnold Palmer, and Tiger Woods (15 major wins). Notable female golfers include Patty Berg (record 15 major wins), Mickey Wright (13 majors), Louise Suggs and Babe Zaharias.

Tennis

Tennis is played in the United States in all five categories (Men's and Ladies' Singles; Men's, Ladies' and Mixed Doubles); however, the most popular are the singles. The pinnacle of the sport in the country is the US Open played in late August at the USTA Billie Jean King National Tennis Center in New York. The Indian Wells Masters, Miami Open and Cincinnati Masters are part of the ATP Tour Masters 1000 and the WTA 1000.

The United States has had considerable success in tennis for many years, with players such as Don Budge, Billie Jean King (12 major singles titles), Chris Evert (18 major singles titles), Jimmy Connors (8 major singles titles), John McEnroe (7 major singles titles), Andre Agassi (8 major singles titles) and Pete Sampras (14 major singles titles), and Ricardo Alonso González (14 major singles titles) dominating their sport in the past. More recently, the Williams sisters, Venus Williams (7 major singles titles) and Serena Williams (23 major singles titles), have been a dominant force in the women's game, and the twin brothers Bob and Mike Bryan have claimed almost all significant career records for men's doubles teams.

Track and field

USA Track & Field is the governing body for track and field in the United States. It organizes the annual USA Outdoor Track and Field Championships and USA Indoor Track and Field Championships. The Diamond League currently features one round in the United States, the Prefontaine Classic; the series formerly included the Adidas Grand Prix as well. Three of the World Marathon Majors are held in the United States: the Boston Marathon, Chicago Marathon and New York City Marathon. The Freihofer's Run for Women is also an IAAF Road Race Label Event. Amateur organizations such as the National Collegiate Athletic Association and Amateur Athletic Union sanction cross-country running in fall, indoor track and field in winter, and outdoor track and field in spring.

Jesse Owens was a notable US track athlete who achieved international fame at the 1936 Summer Olympics in Berlin, Germany, by winning four gold medals: 100 meters, long jump, 200 meters, and 4 × 100-meter relay. He was the most successful athlete at the Games and, as a black man, was credited with "single-handedly crushing Hitler's myth of Aryan supremacy", although he "wasn't invited to the White House to shake hands with the President, either".

Americans have frequently set world standards in various disciplines of track and field for both male and female athletes. Tyson Gay and Michael Johnson hold various sprint records for male athletes, while Florence Griffith Joyner set various world sprint records for female athletes. Mary Slaney set many world records for middle-distance disciplines.

A turning point occurred in US track in the running boom of the 1970s. After a series of American successes in various distances from marathoners Frank Shorter and Bill Rodgers as well as middle-distance runners Dave Wottle and Steve Prefontaine, running as an American pastime began to take shape. The U.S. win in the 1976 Olympic men's decathlon, achieved by then-Bruce Jenner, made Jenner a national celebrity. High school track in the United States became a unique foundation for creating the United States middle-distance running talent pool, and from 1972 to 1981 an average of 13 high school boys in the United States would run under 4:10 in the mile per year. During this time, several national high school records in the United States were set and remained largely unbroken until the 2000s. The number of high school boys running the mile under 4:10 per year dropped abruptly from 1982, and female participation in many distance events was forbidden by athletic authorities until the 1980s. However a renaissance in high school track developed when Jack Daniels, a former Olympian, published a training manual called "Daniels' Running Formula", which became the most widely used distance training protocol among American coaches along with Arthur Lydiard's high-mileage regimen. Carl Lewis is credited with "normalizing" the practice of having a lengthy track career as opposed to retiring once reaching the age when it is less realistic of gaining a personal best result. The United States is home to school-sponsored track and field, a tradition in which most schools from middle school through college feature a track and field team. Owing to the number of American athletes who satisfy Olympic norm standards, the US holds national trials to select the best of its top-tier athletes for Olympic competition.

Combat sports

Boxing

Boxing is an iconic sport in the US and is the focus of the most successful sporting movies both critically and commercially with Oscar winning films like Rocky, Raging Bull and The Fighter. As with many sports it has allowed Black Athletes to breakthrough to become major figures of US culture, with Joe Louis, Mike Tyson and Muhammad Ali all becoming known on the world stage.

Boxing in the United States became the center of professional boxing in the early 20th century. The National Boxing Association was founded in 1921 and began to sanction title fights.

Joe Louis was an American professional boxer who competed from 1934 to 1951. He reigned as the world heavyweight champion from 1937 to 1949, and is considered to be one of the greatest heavyweight boxers of all time. In 2005, Louis was ranked as the best heavyweight of all time by the International Boxing Research Organization, and was ranked number one on The Ring magazine's list of the "100 greatest punchers of all time". Louis had the longest single reign as champion of any heavyweight boxer in history.

Louis is widely regarded as the first person of African-American descent to achieve the status of a nationwide hero within the United States, and was also a focal point of anti-Nazi sentiment leading up to and during World War II. He was instrumental in integrating the game of golf, breaking the sport's color barrier in America by appearing under a sponsor's exemption in a PGA event in 1952.

In the 1960s and 1970s, Muhammad Ali became an iconic figure, transformed the role and image of the African American athlete in America by his embrace of racial pride, and transcended the sport by refusing to serve in the Vietnam War.

In the 1980s Mike Tyson emerged as a serious contender. Nicknamed "Iron Mike", Tyson won the heavyweight unification series to become world heavyweight champion at the age of 20 and the first undisputed champion in a decade. Tyson soon became the most widely known boxer since Ali due to an aura of unrestrained ferocity, such as that exuded by Jack Dempsey or Sonny Liston. His career culminated in Evander Holyfield vs. Mike Tyson II where he famously bit off a piece of Holyfield's ear.

Since the late 1990s boxing has declined in popularity for a myriad of factors such as more sports entertainment options and combat alternatives such as MMA's UFC amongst a younger demographic. Lack of mainstream coverage in newspapers and access on major television networks. Also the lack of a US Heavyweight world champion.

It was hoped in 2015 that the Floyd Mayweather Jr. vs. Manny Pacquiao fight would re-invigorate interest in the sport in the United States but because the fight was disappointing it was perceived as doing further harm to the image of the sport in the United States.

Other Combat Sports

Mixed martial arts in the United States largely developed in the 1990s, and has achieved popularity in the early 21st century. Many companies promote MMA cards, with the U.S. based Ultimate Fighting Championship (UFC) the most dominant.

Traditional "folkstyle" wrestling is performed at the scholastic and college levels. High school wrestling is a popular participatory sport in the United States, with college wrestling and the Olympic wrestling styles of freestyle and Greco-Roman having a spectator following. The Olympic styles of freestyle and Greco-Roman are performed at all age levels in the United States and in international competition.

Judo in the United States is not very popular and is eclipsed by more popular martial art forms like karate and taekwondo.

Swimming and water sports

Swimming is a major competitive sport at high school and college level, but receives little mainstream media attention outside of the Olympics.

Surfing in the United States and watersports are popular in the U.S. in coastal areas. California and Hawaii are the most popular locations for surfing. The Association of Surfing Professionals was founded in 1983.

Five separate national governing bodies (NGBs) make up USAS: USA Swimming, USA Diving, United States Synchronized Swimming, USA Water Polo, and U.S. Masters Swimming. Of the five, only U.S. Masters Swimming (USMS) is not a member of the United States Olympic & Paralympic Committee (USMS's main aim is adult swimming, exclusive of Olympic-swimming which is the domain of USA Swimming).

Popular team sports

Overview
The most popular team sports in the United States are American football, baseball, basketball, ice hockey, and soccer. All five of these team sports are popular with fans, are widely watched on television, have a fully professional league, are played by millions of Americans, enjoy varsity status at many Division I colleges, and are played in high schools throughout the country.

 TV viewing record measures the game with the most TV viewers in the U.S. since 2005 for each sport: 2015 Super Bowl, 2016 NBA Finals Game 7, 2016 World Series Game 7, 2014 FIFA World Cup Final, and 2010 Winter Olympics Gold medal ice hockey game.
 The column titled "States (HS)" represents the number of states that sponsor the sport at the high school level. For the purpose of this table, Washington, D.C. is counted as a state.

American football

Football has the most participants of any sport at both high school and college levels, the vast majority of its participants being male.

The NFL is the preeminent professional football league in the United States. The NFL has 32 franchises divided into two conferences. After a 17-game regular season, each conference sends seven teams to the NFL Playoffs, which eventually culminate in the league's championship game, the Super Bowl.

Nationwide, the NFL obtains the highest television ratings among major sports. Watching NFL games on television on Sunday afternoons has become a common routine for many Americans during the football season. 
Super Bowl Sunday is the biggest annual sporting event held in the United States. The Super Bowl itself is always among the highest-rated programs of all-time in the Nielsen ratings.

The NFL has the highest average attendance (67,591) of any professional sports league in the world and has the highest revenue out of any single professional sports league.

Since 2019, at least one other professional football league has played in each NFL offseason: the Alliance of American Football played eight weeks in winter 2019 before its owner withdrew funding; the XFL—a reimagining of a 2001 league of the same name—played five weeks in winter 2020 before government stay-at-home orders forced the league to shut down, and resumed under new ownership in winter 2023; and the United States Football League—which used abandoned trademarks from, but shares no ownership with, a 1980s league of the same name—began play in spring 2022. All of these leagues pay substantially lower salaries than the NFL and have had lower and less consistent attendance, though popularity in non-NFL markets (such as the XFL's St. Louis BattleHawks) can be robust.

Millions watch college football throughout the fall months, and some communities, particularly in rural areas, place great emphasis on their local high school football teams. The popularity of college and high school football in areas such as the Southern United States (Southeastern Conference) and the Great Plains (Big 12 Conference and Big Ten Conference) stems largely from the fact that these areas historically generally did not possess markets large enough for a professional team. Nonetheless, college football has a rich history in the United States, predating the NFL by decades, and fans and alumni are generally very passionate about their teams.

During football season in the fall, fans have the opportunity to watch high school games on Fridays and Saturdays, college football on Saturdays, and NFL games on Sundays, the usual playing day of the professional teams. However, some colleges play games on Tuesday and Wednesday nights, while the NFL offers weekly games on Monday (since 1970) and Thursday (since 2006). As recently as 2013, one could find a nationally televised professional or college game on television any night between Labor Day and Thanksgiving weekend.

Indoor football or arena football, a form of football played in indoor arenas, has several professional and semi-professional leagues. The Arena Football League was active from 1987 to 2008 and folded in 2009, but several teams from the AFL and its former minor league, af2, relaunched the league in 2010. The AFL folded again in 2019. Most extant indoor leagues date to the mid-2000s and are regional in nature.

Dedicated women's football is seldom seen. A few amateur and semi-professional leagues exist, of varying degrees of stability and competition. Football is unique among scholastic sports in the U.S. in that no women's division exists for the sport; women who wish to play football in high school or college must compete directly with men.

Indoor American football has several professional leagues such as, Indoor Football League, Champions Indoor Football, American West Football Conference, National Arena League, and American Arena League.

Baseball

Baseball and a variant, softball, are popular participatory sports in the U.S. Baseball was the first professional sport in the United States. The highest level of baseball in the U.S. and the world is Major League Baseball. The World Series of Major League Baseball is the culmination of the sport's postseason each October. It is played between the winner of each of the two leagues, the American League and the National League, and the winner is determined through a best-of-seven playoff.

The New York Yankees are noted for having won more titles than any other US major professional sports franchise. The Yankees' chief rivals, the Boston Red Sox, also enjoy a huge following in Boston and throughout New England. The Philadelphia Phillies of the National League are the oldest continuous, one-name, one-city franchise in all of professional American sports, and enjoy a fanbase renowned for their rabid support of their team throughout Philadelphia and the Delaware Valley, and have famously been dubbed as the "Meanest Fans in America". Midwest baseball has also grown exponentially with teams like the Chicago Cubs, St. Louis Cardinals, Cincinnati Reds, and Milwaukee Brewers. Particularly with Chicago sports fans who avidly follow the Chicago Cubs and the Chicago White Sox despite the comparative lack of success for the teams, with Chicago Cub fans being known throughout the country as one of the best baseball fans in the country, most notably for their passionate loyalty to the team despite their not having won a championship from 1908 to 2016 (108 years) which stands as the longest championship drought in US sports history. The sport has also taken hold of fans on the West Coast, most notably the rivalry between the San Francisco Giants and The Los Angeles Dodgers. Historically, the leagues were much more competitive, and cities such as Boston, Philadelphia and St. Louis had rival teams in both leagues up until the 1950s.

Notable American baseball players in history include Babe Ruth (714 career home runs), Ty Cobb (career leader in batting average and batting titles), Cy Young, Honus Wagner, Ted Williams (.344 career batting average), Lou Gehrig, Joe DiMaggio, Mickey Mantle (16-time all star), Stan Musial, Willie Mays, Yogi Berra (18-time All-Star), Hank Aaron (career home run leader from 1974 to 2007), Mike Schmidt (548 career home runs, 10 career Gold Gloves), Nolan Ryan (career strikeouts leader), Roger Clemens (7 Cy Young awards), Derek Jeter and Jackie Robinson, who was instrumental in dissolving the color line and allowing African-Americans into the major leagues.

An extensive minor league baseball system covers most mid-sized cities in the United States. Minor league baseball teams are organized in a six-tier hierarchy, in which the highest teams (AAA) are in major cities that do not have a major league team but often have a major team in another sport, and each level occupies progressively smaller cities. The lowest levels of professional baseball serve primarily as development systems for the sport's most inexperienced prospects, with the absolute bottom, the rookie leagues, occupying the major league squads' spring training complexes.

Some limited independent professional baseball exists, the most prominent being the Atlantic League, which occupies mostly suburban locales that are not eligible for high level minor league teams of their own because they are too close to other major or minor league teams.

Outside the minor leagues are collegiate summer baseball leagues, which occupy towns even smaller than those at the lower end of minor league baseball and typically cannot support professional sports. Summer baseball is an amateur exercise and uses players that choose not to play for payment in order to remain eligible to play college baseball for their respective universities in the spring. At the absolute lowest end of the organized baseball system is senior amateur baseball (also known as Town Team Baseball), which typically plays its games only on weekends and uses rosters composed of local residents.

Liga de Béisbol Profesional Roberto Clemente is a professional baseball league in Puerto Rico.

Basketball

Of those Americans citing their favorite sport, basketball is ranked second (counting amateur levels) behind football. However, in regards to revenue the NBA is ranked third in popularity. More Americans play basketball than any other team sport, according to the National Sporting Goods Association, with over 26 million Americans playing basketball.
Basketball was invented in 1891 by Canadian physical education teacher James Naismith in Springfield, Massachusetts.

The National Basketball Association (NBA) is the world's premier professional basketball league and one of the major professional sports leagues of North America. It contains 30 teams (29 teams in the U.S. and 1 in Canada) that play an 82-game season from October to June. After the regular season, eight teams from each conference compete in the playoffs for the Larry O'Brien Championship Trophy.

Since the 1992 Summer Olympics, NBA players have represented the United States in international competition and won numerous important tournaments. The Dream Team was the unofficial nickname of the United States men's basketball team that won the gold medal at the 1992 Olympics.

Basketball at both the college and high school levels is popular throughout the country. Every March, a 68-team, six-round, single-elimination tournament (commonly called March Madness) determines the national champions of NCAA Division I men's college basketball.

Most U.S. states also crown state champions among their high schools. Many high school basketball teams have intense local followings, especially in the Midwest and Upper South. Indiana has 10 of the 12 largest high school gyms in the United States, and is famous for its basketball passion, known as Hoosier Hysteria.

Notable NBA players in history include Wilt Chamberlain (4 time MVP), Bill Russell (5 time MVP), Bob Pettit (11 time all NBA team), Bob Cousy (12 time all NBA team), Jerry West (12 time all NBA team), Julius Erving (won MVP awards in both the ABA and NBA), Kareem Abdul-Jabbar (6 time MVP), Magic Johnson (3 time MVP), Larry Bird (3 time MVP), Michael Jordan (6 time finals MVP), John Stockton (#1 in career assists and steals), Karl Malone (14 time all NBA team), Kobe Bryant (NBA's third all-time leading scorer), Tim Duncan (15-time NBA all-star), Shaquille O'Neal (3 time finals MVP) and Jason Kidd (#2 in career assists and steals).

Notable players in the NBA today include James Harden, LeBron James (4 MVP awards), Stephen Curry (2 time MVP), and Kevin Durant (MVP, 4 NBA scoring titles). Ever since the 1990s, an increasing number of players born outside the United States have signed with NBA teams, sparking league interest in different parts of the world.

Professional basketball is most followed in cities where there are no other sports teams in the four major professional leagues, such as in the case of the Oklahoma City Thunder, the Sacramento Kings, the San Antonio Spurs, the Memphis Grizzlies, or the Portland Trail Blazers. New York City has also had a long historical connection with college and professional basketball, and many basketball legends initially developed their reputations playing in the many playgrounds throughout the city. Madison Square Garden, the home arena of the New York Knicks, is often referred to as the "Mecca of basketball."

Minor league basketball, both official and unofficial, has an extensive presence, given the sport's relative lack of expense to operate a professional team. The NBA has an official minor league, known since 2017 as the NBA G League under a naming rights agreement with Gatorade. The most prominent independent league is BIG3, a three-on-three league featuring former NBA stars that launched in 2017. Several other pro basketball leagues exist but are notorious for their instability and low budget operations. Another prominent event is The Basketball Tournament. a full-court 64-team knockout tournament held during the summer with a $1 million winner-take-all prize. While current NBA players are contractually barred from playing due to injury risk, several have served as team sponsors, and many players from the G League, as well as Americans playing in overseas leagues, participate.

The WNBA is the premier women's basketball league in the United States as well as the most stable and sustained women's professional sports league in the nation. Several of the 12 teams are owned by NBA teams. The women's national team has won eight Olympic gold medals and 10 FIBA World Cups. Historically, women's basketball in the United States followed a six-woman-per-team format in which three players on each team stayed on the same side of the court throughout the game. The six-person variant was abolished for college play in 1971, and over the course of the 1970s and 1980s was steadily abolished at the high school level, with the last states still sanctioning it switching girls over to the men's five-on-five code in the mid-1990s.

Baloncesto Superior Nacional and Baloncesto Superior Nacional Femenino are professional basketball leagues in Puerto Rico.

Soccer

Soccer has been increasing in popularity in the United States in recent years. Soccer is played by over 13 million people in the U.S., making it the third-most played sport in the U.S., more widely played than ice hockey and football. Most NCAA Division I colleges field both a men's and women's varsity soccer team, and those that field only one team almost invariably field a women's team.

The United States men's national team and women's national team, as well as a number of national youth teams, represent the United States in international soccer competitions and are governed by the United States Soccer Federation (U.S. Soccer). The U.S. women's team holds the record for most Women's World Cup championships, and is the only team that has never finished worse than third place in a World Cup. The U.S. women beat the Netherlands 2–0 in the 2019 FIFA Women's World Cup final to claim their second consecutive Women's World Cup title, and fourth overall.

Major League Soccer (MLS) is the premier soccer league in the United States. The league's predecessor was the major professional North American Soccer League (NASL), which existed from 1968 until 1984. As of its 2023 season, MLS has 29 clubs (26 from the U.S. and 3 from Canada). The 34-game schedule runs from mid-March to late October, with the playoffs and championship in November. Soccer-specific stadiums continue to be built for MLS teams around the country, both because football stadiums are considered to have excessive capacity, and because teams profit from operating their stadiums. With an average attendance of over 21,000 per game (prior to COVID-19), MLS has the third-highest average attendance of any sports league in the U.S. after the National Football League (NFL) and Major League Baseball (MLB), and is the ninth-highest attended professional soccer league worldwide. Other professional men's soccer leagues in the U.S. include the current second division, the USL Championship (USLC), and three third-level leagues: USL League One (USL1), which launched in 2019 under the auspices of the USLC's operator, the United Soccer League; the National Independent Soccer Association (NISA), which also started in 2019; and MLS Next Pro, launched by MLS in 2022 as the effective replacement for its former reserve league. Another competition, the second North American Soccer League, had been the second-level league until being demoted in 2018 due to instability, and soon effectively folded. For several years in the 2010s, the USL organization had a formal relationship with MLS, and a number of its teams (both in the Championship and League One) have been either owned by or affiliated with MLS sides, but most U.S.-based MLS teams moved their reserve sides into Next Pro in 2022, and the only U.S.-based MLS side that will not field a Next Pro team in 2023 is D.C. United.

Younger generations of Americans have strong fan appreciation for the sport, due to factors such as the U.S. hosting of the 1994 FIFA World Cup and the formation of Major League Soccer, as well as increased U.S. television coverage of soccer competitions. Many immigrants living in the United States continue to follow soccer as their favorite team sport. United States will host the 2026 FIFA World Cup, sharing with Canada and Mexico.

Women's professional soccer in the United States only began seeing sustained success in the 2020s. Following the demise of two professional leagues in the early 21st century, the Women's United Soccer Association (1999–2001) and Women's Professional Soccer (2009–2011), U.S. Soccer established a new National Women's Soccer League in 2013. The NWSL has now survived longer than both of its two professional predecessors combined. Of its current 12 teams, six share ownership with professional men's clubs—three are wholly owned by MLS team owners (although one of the NWSL teams was put up for sale after the 2022 season), two are wholly owned by USL sides (one each in the USLC and USL1), and another is primarily owned by a French Ligue 1 side. The NWSL is expected to expand to 14 teams in 2024 and 15 shortly thereafter. However, at the lower levels of the salary scale, the NWSL was until very recently effectively semi-professional. While minimum salaries are still vastly lower than those in men's leagues (as of 2022, $35,000), players generally enjoy at least a middle-class standard of living because the salary figures do not include team-provided housing and transportation allowances.

Many notable international soccer players played in the U.S. in the original North American Soccer League, usually at the end of their playing careers—including Pelé, Eusébio, George Best, Franz Beckenbauer, and Johan Cruyff—or in MLS—including Roberto Donadoni, Lothar Matthäus, David Beckham, Thierry Henry, Kaká, David Villa, Wayne Rooney, Zlatan Ibrahimović, Gareth Bale, Lorenzo Insigne, and Xherdan Shaqiri. The best American soccer players enter the U.S. Soccer Hall of Fame.

The Major Arena Soccer League (MASL) is a North American professional indoor soccer league. MASL is the highest level of arena soccer in the North America and the world.

Ice hockey

Ice hockey, usually referred to in the U.S. simply as "hockey", is another popular sport in the United States. In the U.S. the game is most popular in regions of the country with a cold winter climate, namely the northeast and the upper Midwest. However, since the 1990s, hockey has become increasingly popular in the Sun Belt due in large part to the expansion of the National Hockey League to the southern U.S., coupled with the mass relocation of many residents from northern cities with strong hockey support to these Sun Belt locations.

The NHL is the major professional hockey league in North America, with 25 U.S.-based teams and 7 Canadian-based teams competing for the Stanley Cup. While NHL stars are still not as readily familiar to the general American public as are stars of the NFL, MLB, and the NBA, average attendance for NHL games in the U.S. has surpassed average NBA attendance in recent seasons, buoyed in part by the NHL Winter Classic being played in large outdoor stadiums.

Minor league professional hockey leagues in the U.S. include the American Hockey League and the ECHL. Additionally, nine U.S.-based teams compete in the three member leagues of the Canadian Hockey League, a "junior" league for players aged sixteen to twenty. College hockey has a regional following in the northeastern and upper midwestern United States. It is increasingly being used to develop players for the NHL and other professional leagues (the U.S. has junior leagues, the United States Hockey League and North American Hockey League, but they are more restricted to protect junior players' college eligibility). The Frozen Four is college hockey's national championship. The U.S. now has more youth hockey players than all other countries, excluding Canada, combined. USA Hockey is the official governing body for amateur hockey in the United States. The United States Hockey Hall of Fame is located in Eveleth, Minnesota.

Internationally, the United States is counted among the Big Six, the group of nations that have historically dominated international ice hockey competition. (The others include Canada, Finland, Sweden, the Czech Republic, and Russia.) One of the nation's greatest ever sporting moments was the "Miracle on Ice", which came during the 1980 Winter Olympics when the U.S. hockey team beat the Soviet Union 4–3 in the first game of the medal round before going on to beat Finland to claim the gold medal.

Historically, the vast majority of NHL players had come from Canada, with a small number of Americans. As late as 1969–70, Canadian players made up 95 percent of the league. During the 1970s and 1980s, European players entered the league, and many players from the former Soviet bloc flocked to the NHL beginning in the 1990s. Today, slightly less than half of NHL players are Canadian, more than 30% are Americans, and virtually all of the remainder are European-trained. (For a more complete discussion, see Origin of NHL players.)

Notable NHL players in history include Wayne Gretzky (leading all-time point scorer and 9 time MVP), Mario Lemieux (3 time MVP), Guy Lafleur (2 time MVP), Gordie Howe (6 time MVP), Nicklas Lidström (7 times NHL's top defenseman), Bobby Hull (3 time MVP and 7 time leading goal scorer, Eddie Shore (4 time MVP), Howie Morenz (3 time MVP), Maurice "Rocket" Richard (5 time leading goal scorer), Jean Beliveau (2 time MVP), Bobby Clarke (3 time MVP), and Bobby Orr (8 times NHL's best defenseman). Famous NHL players today include Connor McDavid and Auston Matthews.

The Premier Hockey Federation, founded in 2015 as the National Women's Hockey League, is the first women's ice hockey league in the country to pay its players and features five teams in the northeast and upper midwest, plus two Canadian teams. Three of the five U.S.-based teams (the Buffalo Beauts, Minnesota Whitecaps and Metropolitan Riveters) are either owned or operated by, or affiliated with, their metro area's NHL franchise (the Buffalo Sabres, Minnesota Wild and New Jersey Devils, respectively). At the international level, the United States women's national ice hockey team is one of the two predominant international women's teams in the world, alongside its longtime rival Team Canada.

Other team sports

Overview
The following table shows additional sports that are played by over 500,000 people in the United States.

 Attendance record measures highest single-game attendances. Attendance records are: Volleyball: 2021 NCAA Division I women's championship final; Ultimate: 2014 Montreal Royal (AUDL); Rugby: 2014 New Zealand vs. Ireland in Chicago; and Lacrosse: 2007 NCAA Division I men's championship semifinals.
 TV viewership records are: Volleyball: 2010 NCAA women's championship on ESPN2; Rugby: 2018 Rugby World Cup Sevens on NBC; Lacrosse: 2016 NCAA championship on ESPN2; Ultimate: 2017 US Open Mixed final.

Lacrosse

Lacrosse is a team sport that is believed to have originated with the Iroquois and the Lenape. The sport is most popular in the East Coast area from Maryland to New York. While its roots remain east, lacrosse is currently the fastest growing sport in the nation. The National Lacrosse League is the professional Box lacrosse league, while the Premier Lacrosse League is the professional Field Lacrosse league. Major League Lacrosse was a semi-professional Field Lacrosse league that was operating nationally before merging into PLL in 2020.

Volleyball

Volleyball is played in the United States, especially at the college and university levels. Unlike most Olympic sports which are sponsored widely at the collegiate level for both sexes, the women's college volleyball teams are more common than men's college volleyball teams. In the 2011–12 school year, over 300 schools in NCAA Division I alone (the highest of three NCAA tiers) sponsored women's volleyball at the varsity level, while fewer than 100 schools in all three NCAA divisions combined sponsored varsity men's volleyball, with only 23 of them in Division I. Men's volleyball has grown at the non-scholarship NCAA Division III level in the 21st century, with a national championship established in 2012. As of the most recent 2022 season (2021–22 school year), 113 schools sponsor the sport at that level. At the same time, 26 D-I and 31 D-II members sponsored men's volleyball at the National Collegiate level, defined for the purposes of that sport as the combination of Divisions I and II.

As of 2019, there are currently two leagues that branch across the United States. First of these is the National Volleyball Association (NVA). The NVA currently has 10 teams. The second league is the Volleyball League of America (VLA) and has 5 teams spread across the United States.

The men's national team has won three gold medals at the Olympic Games, one FIVB World Championship, two FIVB Volleyball World Cup, and one FIVB World League. Meanwhile, the women's national team has won one gold medal at the Olympic Games, one FIVB World Championship and six editions of the FIVB World Grand Prix.

Beach volleyball has increasingly become popular in the United States, in part due to media exposure during the Olympic Games. Association of Volleyball Professionals (AVP) is the biggest and longest-running professional beach volleyball tour in the United States.

Rugby union

Rugby union usually referred to in the U.S. simply as "rugby" is played professionally (Major League Rugby), recreationally and in colleges, though it is not governed by the NCAA (see college rugby). An estimated 1.2 million people in the United States play rugby. The U.S. national team has competed at the Rugby World Cup. In rugby sevens, the men's national team is one of 15 "core teams" that participate in every event of the annual World Rugby Sevens Series, and the women's national team is one of 11 core teams in the Women's Sevens Series. Major League Rugby, a professional domestic club competition, has been played since 2018.

Rugby union participation in the U.S. has grown significantly in recent years, growing by 350% between 2004 and 2011. A 2010 survey by the National Sporting Goods Manufacturers Association ranked rugby union as the fastest-growing sport in the U.S. The sports profile in the U.S. has received a tremendous boost from the IOC's announcement in 2009 that rugby union (in its seven-a-side variant) would return to the Olympics in 2016. Since the Olympic announcement, rugby union events such as the Collegiate Rugby Championship, the USA Sevens, and the Rugby World Cup have been broadcast on network TV. The USA Sevens, held every year in February or March as part of the World Rugby Sevens Series, has regularly drawn more than 60,000 fans to Sam Boyd Stadium in Las Vegas, though the tournament will move to the Los Angeles area for at least its 2020 edition. The U.S. also hosts an event in the Women's Sevens Series. It had been held alongside the USA Sevens in the 2016–17 season, but was not held in 2017–18 (when the Rugby World Cup Sevens for both men and women was held in San Francisco). The USA Women's Sevens returned in 2018, after the World Cup Sevens, but is now a standalone event held in the Denver area that serves as the Women's World Series opener.

Rugby union is the fastest growing college sport and sport in general in the United States.

Rugby football formed the basis of modern American football; the two sports were nearly identical in the late 19th century but diverged into distinct, incompatible codes by the start of the 20th century.

The United States will host the 2031 Rugby World Cup and the 2033 Women's Rugby World Cup

Cricket

In 2006 it was estimated that 30,000 people in the United States play or watch cricket annually. By 2017, this figure had risen to 200,000 people playing cricket in 6,000 teams. Cricket in the United States is not as popular as baseball and is not as popular among as large a fraction of the population as it is
within either the Commonwealth nations or the other ICC full member (or Test cricket) nations. There are at least two historical reasons for the relative obscurity of cricket within
the United States. One reason was the 19th-century-rise of the summer time bat and ball sport now called baseball, which has displaced cricket as a popular pastime. Another reason was that in 1909 when the ICC was originally organized as the
Imperial Cricket Conference it was open only to Commonwealth nations and thereby excluded the US from participating in the sport at the highest level.

Nevertheless, in 1965 the US was admitted to the renamed ICC as an associate member and the sport grew in popularity in the second half of the 20th century. An oft mentioned reason for the growing popularity of cricket is the growing population of immigrants to the US who come from cricket playing nations.

With the launching of the United States Youth Cricket Association in 2010, a more focused effort to bring the game to American schools was begun, with the intention of broadening cricket's fan base beyond expatriates and their children.

ESPN has been stepping up its coverage of cricket in recent years, buying the cricket website Cricinfo in 2007, and broadcasting the final of the 2014 ICC World Twenty20 competition, the 2014 Indian Premier League, English County Championship games, and international Test cricket.

In 2021, Minor League Cricket, a professional Twenty20 cricket league sanctioned by USA Cricket, began play. Major League Cricket is planning to launch its first season in 2023. In addition, various championships and pathways are being offered for youth cricketers, such as the MLC Jr. Championship.

Ultimate and disc sports 

Ultimate is a team sport played with a flying disc. The object of the game is to score points by passing the disc to members of your own team until you have completed a pass to a team member in the opposing team's end zone. Over 5.1 million people play some form of organized ultimate in the US.

Alternative sports, using the flying disc, began in the mid-sixties, when numbers of young people looked for alternative recreational activities, including throwing a Frisbee. What started with a few players experimenting with a Frisbee later would become known as playing disc freestyle. Organized disc sports in the 1970s began with a few tournaments, and professionals using Frisbee show tours to perform at universities, fairs and sporting events. Disc sports such as disc freestyle, disc dog (with a human handler throwing discs for a dog to catch), double disc court, disc guts, disc ultimate, and disc golf became this sport's first events. More-proprietary disc games include KanJam, akin to quoits, invented in Buffalo, New York in the 1980s.

Beginning in 1974, the International Frisbee Disc Association became the regulatory organization for all of these sports. Led from 1975–1982 by Dan "Stork" Roddick, who also served as sports-marketing head for Wham-O, the IFA created an annual tournament at the Rose Bowl called the World Frisbee Championship, which drew over 50,000 fans and live TV coverage. This tournament served as a focal point for the more-developed game of Disc guts, invented in the 1950s, and the emerging popularity freestyle competition (1974) and disc golf (standardized in 1976 by the Professional Disc Golf Association).

Around the same time, high school students at Columbia HS in Maplewood NJ invented a disc game in 1968 that they called Ultimate.  Among the three credited with its invention was future hollywood producer Joel Silver.  Spread to mostly East Coast colleges by Columbia HS graduates in the early 1970s, and developed nearly in parallel in Southern California, the game began to have unofficial championships played in 1975.  Loosely organized in its early years, Ultimate developed as an organized sport with the 1979 creation of the Ultimate Players Association.  The sport grew rapidly throughout the country, establishing a Women's division in 1981, splitting its College division from the Club (adult) division in 1984, a Mixed Club division in 1997, and Youth championships from 1998.  In 2010, the UPA re-branded as USA Ultimate, to be more in-line with other sports governing bodies.

As club, college and youth play continued to expand rapidly, more-entrepreneurial enthusiasts looked to turn player interest into spectator dollars.  In 2012, the American Ultimate Disc League became the first professional Ultimate league, followed the next year by Major League Ultimate.  The two ran in parallel through 2016, when MLU folded; AUDL has sustained play through 2019 and expanded from 8 teams in 2012 to 21 teams in 2019.  Although the AUDL's popularity continues to grow, the USA Ultimate Club Division is still viewed as the sport's highest level of play.

In 2015, the International Olympic Committee granted full recognition to the World Flying Disc Federation for flying disc sports including Ultimate.

Other sports

The development of snowboarding was inspired by skateboarding, sledding, surfing and skiing. It was developed in the United States in the 1960s, became a Winter Olympic Sport at Nagano in 1998 and first featured in the Winter Paralympics at Sochi in 2014.

Australian rules football in the United States was first played in the country in 1996. The United States Australian Football League is the governing body for the sport in the U.S, with various clubs and leagues around the country. The National Championships are held annually. The United States men's national Australian rules football team and the women's national team both regularly play international matches, and play in the Australian Football International Cup, an international tournament. The sport also benefits from an active fan based organization, the Australian Football Association of North America.

Bandy is only played in Minnesota. The national team regularly plays in Division A of the Bandy World Championships. In terms of licensed athletes, it is the second biggest winter sport in the world.

Curling is popular in northern states, possibly because of climate, proximity to Canada, or Scandinavian heritage. The national popularity of curling is growing after significant media coverage of the sport in the 2006 and 2010 Winter Olympics.

Gaelic football and hurling are governed by North American GAA and New York GAA. They do not have a high profile but are developing sports, with New York fielding a representative team in the All-Ireland Senior Football Championship.

Field hockey is played in the United States predominantly by women. It is played widely at numerous NCAA colleges.

Handball, a common popular sport in European countries, is seldom seen in the United States. The sport is mostly played in the country on the amateur level. Handball is played in the Summer Olympics, but is not sanctioned by the NCAA; all college and university teams play as club teams. In 2020, a former USA Team Handball CEO Barry Siff said that they are planning to create an American professional team handball league sponsored by Verizon. They are planning to have the owners until the end of 2020, and to launch the league in 2023 with 10 teams with each team initially worth $3 million to $5 million and want to cooperate with NBA or NHL owners in one-tenant arena situations.

Inline hockey was invented by Americans as a way to play the sport in all climates. The PIHA is the league with the largest number of professional teams in the nation. Street hockey is a non-standard version of inline hockey played by amateurs in informal games.

Rugby league in the United States is governed by the USA Rugby League (USARL). The majority of teams are based on the East Coast. The league was founded in 2011 by clubs that had broken with the established American National Rugby League (AMNRL).

The United States national rugby league team played in their first World Cup in 2013 advancing to the quarter finals with wins over Wales and the Cook Islands.
The USA Tomahawks national team would go on to lose to champions Australia 62–0.

Water polo does not have a professional competition in the U.S., so the highest level of competitive play is at the college level and in the Olympics. The NCAA sanctions water polo as a varsity sport for both men and women, and is popular in the U.S. along the west coast, and parts of the east coast. However, no team outside of California has ever reached the finals of the NCAA Division I men's water polo championship.

Organization of American sports

Professional sports

For the most part, unlike sports in Europe and other parts of the world, there is no system of promotion and relegation in American professional sports. Major sports leagues operate as associations of franchises. The same 30–32 teams play in the league each year unless they move to another city or the league chooses to expand with new franchises.

All American sports leagues use the same type of schedule. After the regular season, the 10–16 teams with the best records enter a playoff tournament leading to a championship series or game. American sports, except for soccer and women's basketball, have no equivalent to the cup competitions that run concurrently with leagues in European sports. In soccer, the most established cup competitions, the Lamar Hunt U.S. Open Cup for men's teams throughout all levels, and the NWSL Challenge Cup for teams in that league, draw considerably less attention than the regular season. The Leagues Cup, previously an invitational event involving a small number of teams from MLS and Mexico's top level of Liga MX, is expanding in 2023 to include all teams from the two leagues; its status relative to the MLS regular season remains to be seen. In basketball, the WNBA launched the Commissioner's Cup in the 2021 season, but the qualification process for the one-off Cup final, held at midseason, is based on a subset of regular-season games for all teams. Also, the only top-level U.S. professional teams that play teams from other organizations in meaningful games are those in MLS. Since the 2012 season, all U.S.-based MLS teams have automatically qualified for the U.S. Open Cup, in which they compete against teams from lower-level U.S. leagues. In addition, several U.S.-based MLS teams qualify to play clubs from countries outside the U.S. and Canada in the CONCACAF Champions League. NBA teams have played European teams in preseason exhibitions on a semi-regular basis, and recent MLS All-Star Games have pitted top players from the league against major European soccer teams, such as members of the Premier League.

International competition is not as important in American sports as it is in the sporting culture of most other countries, although Olympic ice hockey and basketball tournaments do generate attention. The first international baseball tournament with top-level players, the World Baseball Classic, also generated some positive reviews after its inaugural tournament in 2006.

The major professional sports leagues operate drafts once a year, in which each league's teams selected eligible prospects. Eligibility differs from league to league. Baseball and ice hockey operate minor league systems for players who have finished education but are not ready or good enough for the major leagues. The NBA also has a development league for players who are not ready to play at the top level.

College sports

The extent to which sports are associated with secondary and tertiary education in the United States is rare among nations. Millions of students participate in athletics programs operated by high schools and colleges. Student-athletes often receive scholarships to colleges in recognition of their athletic potential. Currently, the largest governing body of collegiate sports is the National Collegiate Athletic Association (NCAA).

Especially in football and basketball, college sports are followed in numbers equaling those of professional sports. College football games can draw over 100,000 spectators. For upper-tier institutions, sports are a significant source of revenue; for less prominent teams, maintaining a high-level team is a major expense. To ensure some semblance of competitive balance, the NCAA divides its institutions into three divisions (four in football), sorted by the number of athletic scholarships each school is willing to offer.

The most practiced college sports, measured by NCAA reporting on varsity team participation, are: (1) football (64,000), (2) baseball/softball (47,000), (3) track and field (46,000), (4) soccer (43,000), (5) basketball (32,000), (6) cross-country running (25,000), and (7) swimming/diving (20,000). The most popular sport among female athletes is soccer, followed closely by track and field.

Junior college athletics are governed by separate bodies. In most of the country, all sports at that level are governed by the National Junior College Athletic Association (NJCAA). California's community colleges have their own governing body, the California Community College Athletic Association (CCCAA; usually pronounced as "3C-2A"). In the Pacific Northwest, most sports are governed by the Northwest Athletic Conference (NWAC). Because the NWAC does not sponsor football, members that play football do so as part of the NJCAA.

High school sports

Most public high schools are members of their respective state athletic association, and those associations are members of the National Federation of State High School Associations (NFHS). Some states have separate associations for public and non-public high schools.

The 2018–19 school year was the first in 30 years to see a decrease in high school sports participation. Increases through the previous decades had been largely driven by growth in girls' participation. The high school sports with the highest number of participants for 2018–19 are:

Team sports
 Football – 1,008,417
 Basketball – 939,836
 Baseball/Softball – 854,859
 Soccer – 853,182
 Volleyball – 516,371

Individual sports
 Track & field (outdoor) – 1,093,621
 Cross country – 488,640
 Tennis – 348,750
 Swimming & diving – 309,726
 Wrestling – 268,565

Notes

Popular high school sports in various regions of the U.S. include the Texas High School football championships, the Indiana basketball championships, and ice hockey in Minnesota.
The Minnesota State High School Hockey Tournament is the largest high school sporting event in the country, with average attendance to the top tier, or "AA", games over 18,000.

Amateur sports

The Amateur Athletic Union claims to have over 670,000 participants and over 100,000 volunteers.. The AAU has existed since 1888, and has been influential in amateur sports for that same time span.

In the 1970s, the AAU received growing criticism. Many claimed that its regulatory framework was outdated. Women were banned from participating in certain competitions and some runners were locked out.  There were also problems with sporting goods that did not meet the standards of the AAU. During this time, the Amateur Sports Act of 1978 organized the United States Olympic Committee and saw the re-establishment of state-supported independent associations for the Olympic sports, referred to as national governing bodies. As a result, the AAU lost its influence and importance in international sports, and focused on the support and promotion of predominantly youthful athletes, as well as on the organization of national sports events.

Government regulation

No American government agency is charged with overseeing sports. However, the President's Council on Physical Fitness and Sports advises the President through the Secretary of Health and Human Services about physical activity, fitness, and sports, and recommends programs to promote regular physical activity for the health of all Americans.The U.S. Congress has chartered the United States Olympic & Paralympic Committee to govern American participation in the Olympic and Paralympic movements, and promote Olympic and Paralympic sports. Congress has also involved itself in several aspects of sports, notably gender equity in college athletics, illegal drugs in pro sports, sports broadcasting and the application of antitrust law to sports leagues.

Individual states may also have athletic commissions, which primarily govern individual sports such as boxing, kickboxing and mixed martial arts. Notable state athletic commissions are the Nevada Athletic Commission, California State Athletic Commission, New York State Athletic Commission and New Jersey State Athletic Control Board. Although these commissions only have jurisdiction over their own states, the Full Faith and Credit Clause of the U.S. Constitution is often interpreted as forcing all other states to recognize any state athletic commission's rulings regarding an athlete's fitness for participating in a sport.

Sports media in the United States

Sports have been a major part of American broadcasting since the early days of radio. Today, television networks and radio networks pay millions (sometimes billions) of dollars for the rights to broadcast sporting events.  Contracts between leagues and broadcasters stipulate how often games must be interrupted for commercials. Because of all of the advertisements, broadcasting contracts are very lucrative and account for the biggest chunk of major professional teams' revenues. Broadcasters also covet the television contracts for the major sports leagues (especially in the case of the NFL) in order to amplify their ability to promote their programming to the audience, especially young and middle-aged adult males.

The advent of cable and satellite television has greatly expanded sports offerings on American TV. ESPN, the first all-sports cable network in the U.S., went on the air in 1979. It has been followed by several sister networks and competitors.  Some sports television networks are national, such as CBS Sports Network, Fox Sports 1 and NBC Sports Network, whereas others are regional, such as NBC Sports Regional Networks, Bally Sports and Spectrum Sports. General entertainment channels like TBS, TNT, and USA Network also air sports events.
Some sports leagues have their own sports networks, such as NFL Network, MLB Network, NBA TV, NHL Network, Big Ten Network, Pac-12 Network and SEC Network. Some sports teams run their own television networks as well.

Sports are also widely broadcast at the local level, ranging from college and professional sports down to (on some smaller stations) recreational and youth leagues. Internet radio has allowed these broadcasts to reach a worldwide audience.

Most popular sports in the United States

In the broadest definition of sports—physical recreation of all sorts—the four most popular sports among the general population of the United States are exercise walking (90 million), exercising with equipment (53 million), swimming (52 million) and camping (47 million). The most popular competitive sport (and fifth most popular recreational sport) is bowling (43 million). Other most popular sports are fishing (35 million), bicycling (37 million), weightlifting (33 million), aerobics (30 million), and hiking (28 million).

According to a January 2018 Poll by Gallup, 37% of Americans consider football their favorite spectator sport, while 11% prefer basketball, 9% baseball, and 7% soccer. There is some variation by viewer demographics. Men, show a stronger preference for football than women, conservatives a stronger preference than liberals, and those over 35 a stronger preference than those under 35. In all groups, however, football is still the most popular. Basketball and soccer are more popular among liberals than conservatives.

Pickleball, a racquet sport invented in the state of Washington in 1965, was designated Washington's official state sport in 2022. For two years in a row, 2021 and 2022, the sport was named the fastest growing sport in the United States by the Sports and Fitness Industry Association (SFIA). Between 2019 and 2022 the SFIA estimates the number of US players increased almost 40% to 4.8 million. Projections suggest there could be as many as 40 million players in the United States by the end of the decade.

Sports leagues in the United States

The sports leagues
The following table shows the professional sports leagues, which average over 15,000 fans per game and that have a national TV contract that pays rights fees.

Other team sports leagues

 American Ultimate Disc League (AUDL)
 National Volleyball Association (NVA)
 Association of Volleyball Professionals (AVP)
 National Women's Soccer League (NWSL)
 Major Arena Soccer League (MASL)
 United Soccer League (USL)
 Men's leagues:
 USL Championship (USLC)
 USL League One (USL1)
 USL League Two (USL2)
 Women's leagues:
 USL Super League (USLS; planned launch in 2024)
 USL W League (USLW)
 MLS Next Pro
 National Independent Soccer Association (NISA)
 Premier Lacrosse League (PLL)
 National Lacrosse League (NLL)
 Minor League Baseball:
 Triple-A leagues:
 International League
 Pacific Coast League
 Double-A leagues:
 Eastern League
 Southern League
 Texas League
 High-A leagues:
 Midwest League
 Northwest League
 South Atlantic League
 Low-A leagues:
 California League
 Carolina League
 Florida State League
 Rookie leagues:
 Arizona Complex League
 Florida Complex League
 MLB Partner Leagues:
 American Association
 Atlantic League
 Frontier League
 Pioneer League
 Major League Rugby (MLR) (Union)
 USA Rugby League (USARL) 
 National Collegiate Athletic Association (NCAA)
 Premier Hockey Federation (PHF)
 American Hockey League (AHL)
 ECHL 
 Federal Prospects Hockey League (FPHL)
 Southern Professional Hockey League (SPHL)
 National Pro Fastpitch (NPF)
 United States Australian Football League (USAFL)
 Professional Inline Hockey Association (PIHA)
 Women's National Basketball Association (WNBA)
 NBA G League
 USFL
 XFL
 National Gay Flag Football League (NGFFL)
 Women's Football Alliance (WFA)
 Major League Cricket (MLC)
 North American Floorball League (NAFL)

Other individual sports leagues

Auto racing
 IndyCar (was Indy Racing League (IRL), merged with Champ Car)
 International Motor Sports Association (IMSA, sanctions IMSA SportsCar Championship)
 National Association of Stock Car Automobile Racing (NASCAR)
 National Hot Rod Association (NHRA)
 Bowling
 PBA Tour
 United States Bowling Congress (USBC)
 Combat
 Bellator Fighting Championships
 Ultimate Fighting Championship (UFC)
 Flying Disc
 Professional Disc Golf Association (PDGA)
 Golf
 Legends Tour, for women's golfers 45 and over
 LPGA Tour
 Epson Tour, developmental tour for the LPGA
 PGA Tour
 PGA Tour Champions, for men's golfers 50 and over; operated by the PGA Tour
 Korn Ferry Tour, developmental tour for the PGA Tour
 Juggling
 World Juggling Federation (WJF)
 Pickleball
 Major League Pickleball (MLP)
 Professional Pickleball Association (PPA)
 Association of Pickleball Professionals (APP)
 Rodeo
 Professional Bull Riders (PBR)
 Professional Rodeo Cowboys Association (PRCA)

Sports governing bodies

 Automobile Competition Committee for the United States (ACCUS)
 USA Boxing (USAB)
 USA Basketball (USAB)
 USA Cycling (USAC)
 USA Cricket (USAC)
 USA Football (USAF)
 USA Baseball (USAB)
 USA Hockey (USAH)
 USA Pickleball (USAP)
 USA Rugby (Union) (USAR)
 USA Rugby League (USARL)
 USA Table Tennis (USATT)
 USA Team Handball (USATH)
 USA Track & Field (USATF)
 USA Volleyball (USAV)
 United States Aquatic Sports (USAS)
 United States Bobsled and Skeleton Federation (USBFS)
 United States Golf Association (USGA)
 United States Rowing Association (USRA)
 United States Ski and Snowboard 
 United States Snooker Association (USSA)
 United States Soccer Federation (USSF)
 United States Tennis Association (USTA)

See also
 Sports in the United States by state
 Sports Museum of America
 Professional sports in the Western United States
 Record attendances in United States club soccer
 Homosexuality in sports in the United States
 Sport in the United Kingdom

Notes

References

Further reading 
 Gerdy, John R. Sports: The All-American Addiction (2002) online
 Gorn, Elliott J. A Brief History of American Sports (2004)
 Harris, Othello, George Kirsch, et al. eds. Encyclopedia of Ethnicity and Sports in the United States (2000) excerpts
 Jackson III, Harvey H. ed. The New Encyclopedia of Southern Culture: Sports & Recreation (2011) online
 Jay, Kathryn. More Than Just a Game: Sports in American Life since 1945 (2004). online
 Reiss, Steven A. ed. Sports in America from Colonial Times to the Twenty-First Century: An Encyclopedia (3 vol 2011) excerpt

External links